Joaquim Pedro Pacheco (born 30 March 1926) is a Portuguese former footballer who played as a defender.

External links 
 
 

1926 births
Possibly living people
Portuguese footballers
Association football defenders
Primeira Liga players
Sporting CP footballers
Portugal international footballers